Wang Gen (Wang Ken ), (20 July 1483 – 2 January 1541) was a Ming dynasty  Neo-Confucian philosopher who popularized the teachings of Wang Yangming.  Wang gen was the founder of the Taizhou School.

References

1483 births
1541 deaths
Ming dynasty philosophers
16th-century Chinese philosophers
Neo-Confucian scholars